One57, formerly known as Carnegie 57, is a 75-story,  supertall skyscraper at 157 West 57th Street between Sixth and Seventh Avenues in the Midtown neighborhood of Manhattan in New York City. The building has 92 condominium units on top of a new Park Hyatt Hotel with 210 rooms, the flagship Hyatt property. The tower was developed by Extell Development Company and designed by Christian de Portzamparc. It was the first ultra-luxury condominium tower along a stretch of 57th Street called Billionaires' Row.  

One57 contains a facade made of panels in various shades of blue. The building has a curved roof and, on the side facing 57th Street, contains several setbacks that resemble waterfalls. One57's structural features include concrete floor slabs and two basement levels. The residential interiors contain furniture and materials by Thomas Juul-Hansen. The tower's design, particularly its facade and shape, was negatively critiqued upon its completion. 

Extell CEO Gary Barnett started acquiring One57's site in 1998, although building plans were not filed until 2009. Construction started in 2010, and work reached the top floor by mid-2012. Toward the end of construction, there were two major incidents: a collapsed construction crane requiring the evacuation of nearby buildings, as well as a fire. Upon completion in 2014, it was the tallest residential building in the city for a few months until the completion of 432 Park Avenue. The building set the records for the city's most and second-most expensive residences, selling respectively for $100.5 million and $91.5 million. However, sale prices started dropping in the late 2010s due to a general decline in the luxury condominium market in New York City.

Site 
One57 is in the Midtown Manhattan neighborhood of New York City, just south of Central Park, between Sixth Avenue to the east and Seventh Avenue to the west. The building contains frontage along 57th Street to the south and 58th Street to the north. The building is along 6½ Avenue, a pedestrian walkway running parallel to Sixth and Seventh Avenues. It is aligned roughly with the center axis of Central Park.

One57 is on the same city block as Alwyn Court, The Briarcliffe, and 165 West 57th Street to the west, as well as the Nippon Club, Calvary Baptist Church, 111 West 57th Street, and The Quin to the east. One57 is also near Carnegie Hall and Carnegie Hall Tower to the southwest; the Russian Tea Room and Metropolitan Tower to the south; 130 West 57th Street and 140 West 57th Street to the southeast; and JW Marriott Essex House and Hampshire House to the north. One57 is one of several major developments around 57th Street and Central Park that are collectively dubbed Billionaires' Row by the media. Other buildings along Billionaires' Row include 432 Park Avenue four blocks southeast, 220 Central Park South one block northwest, Central Park Tower one block west, and the nearby 111 West 57th Street.

Architecture

One57 was developed by Extell Development Company, which in turn was led by Gary Barnett. The building was designed by architect Christian de Portzamparc, while the interior design was by New York-based designer Thomas Juul-Hansen. According to Juul-Hansen, the overall design was redone "three or four times" before the final design was created.

The top story is numbered as floor 90.

Form and facade 
The dark and light glass on the building’s exterior was intended to create vertical stripes, absorb sunlight in various ways, and maximizes views. The base of the building on 57th Street has undulating vertical glass strips around and above the entrances, which are also meant to symbolize a waterfall. The eastern and western facades are designed with a color effect that de Portzamparc described as being similar to the work of Gustav Klimt, the Austrian painter. A separate residential entrance also exists on the north facade at 58th Street.

At ground level, One57 has an "L"-shaped floor plan extending both north to 58th Street and east along 57th Street. The building's massing, or shape, contains curved setbacks, which were meant to resemble a waterfall. The tower has rippled canopies and numerous setbacks on the 57th Street side. By contrast, the facade along 58th Street, facing Central Park, has a flatter profile without setbacks. The curved roof of the building conceals a cooling tower.

According to facade contractor Permasteelisa, the facade is made of 8,200 pieces in over 2,200 distinct shapes, covering . A slightly different figure of 8,400 figures is cited by television network PBS. Among the shapes that are used in the facade are curved panels, at the setbacks; curved corner panels, at the extreme ends of the setbacks; "peel-outs", consisting of adjacent curved and flat panels; and the undulating "teardrop" panels around the entrances. Most shapes are used infrequently, with the most common shape being used about 300 times. The window cleaning deck hangs from a retractable crane arm that is installed on the roof.

Structural features 
This was meant to accommodate the interior uses, which include both a hotel on the lower floors and residential condominiums on the upper floors. The 12,000 psi strength concrete is used from the ground level to floor 26. The building also contains two subterranean stories, as well as a foundation composed of spread footings on the Manhattan bedrock.

To stiffen the building, shear walls are placed around the utility core containing the elevators and stairs, and wing shear walls are also installed. In addition, there are three mechanical levels spread out across the building, surrounded by one-story concrete walls, which in turn are designed to resist lateral forces. Where the setbacks on the facade are present, there are girders to transfer the loads between columns. An additional set of girders to transfer loads is installed above the residential amenity area on floor 20. The top of the building is stabilized by four liquid tuned mass dampers. The dampers are meant to provide stability against high winds or earthquakes.

Interior
The interiors of One57 were made of material from around the world. Roy Kim, the senior vice president of design at Extell, traveled to Carrara in Italy to approve every piece of white marble used for the apartments' bathrooms. The marble collectively cost several million dollars; a single slab costing $130,000 was enough to create two benches and two bathtubs. The wooden furniture was from the English county of Wiltshire, where a company was contracted to hand-make 3,500 wooden cabinet doors as well as 135 kitchens in 18 layouts. The lobby contains  steel panels, which collectively cost $800,000; they had to be carried into the building through a narrow gap without being damaged.

Hotel 
The lowest section of One57 contains the Park Hyatt New York, a 210-room hotel that serves as the flagship Hyatt property. The hotel occupies the lowest 18 physical stories of the tower, but publications cite the hotel as having 25 numbered floors. 

There are 12 rooms each on the fourth and fifth stories, 16 each on the sixth through eleventh stories, 14 each on the twelfth through sixteenth stories, and 10 each on the seventeenth and eighteenth stories. When the Park Hyatt opened in 2014, the rooms were listed for at least $855 per night. Yabu Pushelberg was hired to design the hotel's interiors. The design includes 350 contemporary artworks spread across the hotel, as well as furnishings and fabrics, many of which were designed specifically for the Park Hyatt. The suites cover at least  and have sitting areas with glass partitions. The hotel's "deluxe" suites contain at least  of space. The hotel also gave guests iPads to request room service.

The Hyatt was designed with a ballroom, spa, swimming pool, fitness room, and conference rooms. The ballroom and meeting rooms are on the second story. The hotel's pool, on the 20th story (labeled as floor 25), contains underwater speakers that play classical music from Carnegie Hall. The hotel's Spa Nalai, covering  on the same floor, contains several treatment suites, some of which have balconies. The spa's name was derived from the word for "serenity" in the Munsee language, originally spoken by the Lenape Native American population of Manhattan. The hotel also originally included an American grill called the Back Room, which was led by chef Sebastien Archambault when it opened in August 2014. Also included is a bar called The Living Room. The Onyx Room, the hotel's event space, has backlit slabs of white onyx on the walls.

Condominiums 
Above the hotel are 92 condominium units, of which 52 face Central Park directly. The condominiums are served by a bank of three elevators that travel  and can run between the ground floor and the top story in 40 seconds. Extell had deemed the residential floor plans to be so crucial that the floor plans were created before de Portzamparc was officially hired as architect and before the exterior was designed. The apartment corridors contain silk coverings on the walls, which contain asymmetrical doorways to each unit. The apartments were designed with relatively few bedrooms so the spaces could remain large. There are mechanical rooms on the physical 19th, 47th, and 73rd stories. 

There are slightly different floor plans throughout the building. The 22nd and 23rd stories have five units each, plus a duplex split between the two stories, while the 24th through 30th stories have six units each. The 31st and 32nd stories have three units each, plus a duplex split between the two stories, while the 33rd through 41st stories have three units each. There are two apartments each on the 42nd through 44th stories and three apartments each on the 45th and 46th stories. The 48th through 57th stories (with the exception of the 54th story) each have two apartments, while the 60th through 70th stories each have one unit occupying an entire floor. The 58th and 59th stories have a single duplex unit, as do the 71st and 72nd stories. Typical of the full-story units is the apartment on the 62nd story (labeled as floor 82), designed with a  salon overlooking Central Park, as well as a breakfast room, kitchen, private foyer, reception gallery, and  ceilings.

The apartments were furnished with Italian marble, rosewood flooring, specialized lighting and hardware, and kitchen appliances made by Smallbone of Devizes. Some of the kitchen appliances, such as dishwashers and refrigerators, were built into the apartments. A typical apartment, such as the three-bedroom unit on floor 58, was decorated with a toilet room with white-onyx floors; and baths with different types of marbles. The bathrooms have bidets and toilets manufactured by Duravit, as well as in-room televisions. Some units have two juxtaposed toilet rooms within their master bedrooms. Some residents further customized their units with decorative elements. One condominium unit on floor 67 was purchased in 2015, underwent a renovation, and was placed for sale in 2017. Among the features of that unit were marble-slab floors, white-gold leaf walls, a white-oak paneled living room, and a vaulted dining-room ceiling. Another unit, 61B, was decorated with $2.5 million of furnishings designed by Jeffrey Beers. Some of the units also contain private swimming pools.

According to the bylaws of One57's condominium board, residents could have up to two "orderly domestic" pets, of which residents were required to send photos to the board. Certain pets, such as pigs, hens, rabbits, and gerbils, are banned. Guests could not bring pets. In addition, window decorations are banned, and the board has to approve window curtains and blinds. The building was initially maintained by a staff of eighteen, which was relatively small in comparison to other residential developments in New York City. This took into account the fact that many residents were not expected to live at One57 year-round and, as such, a larger staff was not needed. The resident manager has their own two-bedroom apartment on the southwest corner of floor 34. Matthew Shaer of New York magazine compared the apartments to an "investment, a collectible item, a safe-deposit box" for the ultra-wealthy.

Amenities 
One57 was constructed with several amenities for residents. Entry to the building is overseen by a 24-hour concierge and doorman service. An amenities floor, occupying , is included above the hotel. The residents' amenities floor is on the 21st story, directly above the hotel amenities on the 20th story. The building also has resident parking, a library, a kitchen, an arts-and-crafts space, a fitness room, a yoga room, and a pet washroom. There are also rooms for screening and performance, with leather seats for 24 people. Also included is a triple-height swimming pool and a Jacuzzi. A New York Times reporter, writing on the amenities in 2018, wrote that the building's "lifestyle attaché" Sascha Torres had also created events such as a wine-tasting, jazz concert, and Halloween trick-or-treating for the residents. Residents could also use the amenity spaces at the Hyatt hotel a la carte. 

The bins were marketed for up to $200,000 in 2011, which at the time was a higher price per square foot than most Manhattan apartments and, according to The Wall Street Journal, more than a single-family home in Topeka, Kansas. The least expensive bins cost $110,000 and contained . By 2014, Extell had filed for an amendment with the Attorney General of New York to include 21 storage bins.

History

Planning 
Extell Development Company’s founder and president, Gary Barnett, acquired the property and air rights over fifteen years, buying the first property on One57's present site in 1998. At first, Barnett said he wanted to build a 40-story,  building for $300 million. However, plans for views of Central Park took shape as the assemblage got larger and markets started rising. By 2002, Barnett had acquired a small building at 161 West 57th Street, as well as the air rights over 165 West 57th Street. The area at the time contained several brownstone townhouses, as well as a parking garage and the Park Savoy hotel. Even though Barnett was able to acquire the garage and townhouses, he did not buy the Park Savoy because the building's owners asked $80 million, almost eight times what Barnett was willing to pay.

Around 2007, Barnett was introduced to Khadem al-Qubaisi, head of Emirati investment funds Aabar Investments and Tasameem Real Estate Company, who agreed to fund the project. The structures at 151 through 161 West 57th Street were being demolished by May 2007, when Barnett announced that a residential and hotel building with at least 50 stories would be built on the site. Demolition was completed that November. No further progress had been made by the following August when the New York Post reported that Extell had not yet filed plans with the New York City Department of Buildings.  Plans for excavation were filed in November 2008. The following month, the media reported that the website of project contractor Aegis Security Design indicated that the site would include a Park Hyatt hotel, along with stores and luxury condominiums. At the time, Extell was consulting with city agencies to purchase air rights from neighboring sites, including the Alwyn Court and 165 West 57th Street. An early plan to erect a  tower was changed after the financial crisis of 2007–2008, as well as the inability to acquire a neighboring site. Seven buildings on the site were demolished.

Plans for a tower at 157 West 57th Street were filed in March 2009. SLCE Architects was listed as the architect of record, with input from Frank Williams and Costas Kondylis, although de Portzamparc was also rumored to be involved. The plans called for a 73-story,  tower with 210 hotel rooms on the lowest twenty floors, amenity rooms on the 21st story, a mechanical space on the 46th story, and 136 residences on the other stories between floors 22 and 72. De Portzamparc's involvement was confirmed in a September 2009 article in French newspaper Le Figaro. That November, Aabar announced it had paid Extell for a majority stake in the construction of 157 West 57th Street. The development was to be the first major project in New York City after the late-2000s financial crisis. At the time, the city's unemployment rate was a relatively high 10 percent, and many major projects had been either canceled or delayed.

Construction

Early work 
Partial work permits for 157 West 57th Street were issued in September 2009. Foundation work started in 2009 and took over a year, because of the difficulty of digging two basement levels and the building's supports. Aside from the foundation work, details on the construction process remained scarce. Revised plans were submitted to the Department of Buildings in March 2010. The changes included adding two floors, combining some of the units into duplex apartments, and enclosing some of the setback terraces that had been included in the original design. Two months later, the media announced that the development would be called Carnegie 57.

The main contractor, Lendlease, started constructing the skyscraper's reinforced columns in August 2010. At the time, Barnett said Extell was negotiating with a potential lender for a $1.3 billion loan. In May 2011, the project was officially renamed One57, a reference to its house number of 157 and to the fact that the building would be located on 57th Street. This rebranding was made in advance of the expected launch of sales for the building. By that July, construction had reached the 22nd floor. Extell received a $700 million construction loan for the project in October 2011 from a syndicate led by the Bank of America, which included Banco Santander, Abu Dhabi International Bank, and Capital One. Of this loan, $375 million was to be paid off by the expected opening of the Park Hyatt hotel.

Completion and incidents 

Sales at the project officially launched in December 2011. The smallest units (starting at $3.5 million) and the two-bedroom units (starting at $6.5 million) both sold quickly. At the end of that month, Sotheby's International Realty broker Elizabeth Sample said that many millionaires and billionaires had expressed interest in the building's sales showroom. Facade installation was underway by January 2012. The next month, the New York Daily News reported that brokers had already earned a combined $3 million from commissions for selling apartments at One57. At the time, the clients were quoted as being "Russian billionaires, Asian investors and prime ministers". By the next May, Extell announced that One57 was 50 percent sold with $1 billion in transactions. One of these was a  duplex penthouse on the 89th and 90th floors, which sold for $90 million, then a citywide record. Framework for the top floor was completed by October 2012.

On October 29, 2012, in the aftermath of Hurricane Sandy, the construction crane on the building partially collapsed, requiring a six-day evacuation for thousands of neighborhood residents. In response to the crane collapse, area dentists filed a class-action lawsuit alleging that the evacuation caused a lack of income. The New York City Department of Buildings (DOB) also stated they had received multiple complaints about the worksite. However, the crane was inspected a week earlier and considered in good shape, leading city officials to call the boom's failure a freakish occurrence. The accident did not affect sales and, in May 2013, Extell announced it would hoist a new crane after the DOB had approved it. Residents of the neighboring Alwyn Court and Briarcliff apartment buildings were forced to evacuate and received up to $1,500 each. The coop board at the Alwyn Court attempted to block the forced evacuation, but the crane was hoisted as planned after Extell and the Alwyn signed an undisclosed agreement.

By October 2013, the facade was largely completed and the replacement crane was being disassembled. That month, the crane experienced another mechanical failure that caused a closure of the surrounding block of 57th Street. The crane was removed by the next month. In March 2014, a fire broke out in the loading dock of One57, spreading into the courtyard behind the building and then onto the adjacent property at 152 West 58th Street. Some work on One57's facade continued through 2015, during which there were three incidents in which glass fell from the facade. After the third incident, when a slab of plexiglass fell from the 22nd floor in March 2015, a stop-work order temporarily halted construction on the building. The stop-work order was rescinded two days later.

Occupancy 
When One57 was nearly completed, the cheapest units were the staff's studio apartments, which were marketed for $1.59 million each. Each of the units on the top eleven floors was listed at no less than $50 million, and the penthouse was marketed at $110 million. The building's units were collectively marketed for a combined $2 billion. Monthly charges for individual units varied; a three-bedroom unit on floor 41 had a monthly fee of about $4,600 while a penthouse on floor 87 had a monthly fee of $13,000.  The first contracts at One57 were finalized in December 2013, and 27 owners had moved into their homes in the first six months. By May 2014, three-fourths of the residential units had been sold, with sales on thirteen units having been closed and sixty more in contract. The first resale at One57 occurred that October, when a unit was resold for $34 million, a $3.45 million increase from the initial sale price five months prior. By then, competition from other developments on Billionaires' Row had caused sales to stall at just above 75 percent. One57 became the city's most expensive building per square foot by 2015, with residences selling for an average of  that year. 

The developer had received a 421-a tax exemption for One57, which permitted a 94 percent tax abatement in exchange for Extell building affordable housing elsewhere. Several politicians opposed the exemption, including city comptroller John Liu, who described it as billionaires' subsidy. In May 2015, as part of the program, Extell was renting out 38 apartments on the seven stories immediately above the hotel. The rental units were still extremely expensive compared to other developments in the city; The Wall Street Journal estimated that potential renter would need a minimum annual income of $534,000 to rent a one-bedroom unit and $2 million for a three-bedroom unit. By that November, Extell was seeking to sell the rental portion of the building for $250 million. With a general decline in the rate of luxury rental agreements, Extell changed its plans in April 2016 and instead marketed the rental units as condominiums. Ultimately, Extell only created 66 affordable units in the Bronx using the tax abatement for One57, which normally could have been used to create 370 affordable units.

Media outlets reported in 2016 that the International Petroleum Investment Company—the parent company of the building's main financier, Aabar—was linked to the 1Malaysia Development Berhad scandal. Because Aabar's head, al-Qubaisi, had been implicated in the scandal, the financing of One57 was investigated as well. The next year, Nigerian businessman Kola Aluko was investigated for money laundering; the suspected laundering included his purchase of a penthouse apartment at One57. That May saw the first foreclosure in the building, for another apartment. Aluko's $51 million apartment was also foreclosed upon shortly thereafter; it was ultimately sold for $36 million in September 2017, the largest foreclosure auction in city history. The two foreclosures, amid a slowing luxury real estate market, raised public scrutiny about the viability of Billionaires' Row, where more luxury residential towers were being erected at the time.

By late 2018, the luxury real estate market in New York City had stalled. To lure tenants, Extell unveiled new buyer's incentives, offering to waive between three and five years of common charges and pay 50% of broker's commissions. The downturn was worsened by a general decrease in real estate activity in 2020 due to the COVID-19 pandemic in New York City. One57 contained the most expensive residence sold in the city that June: an 88th-story apartment that sold for $28 million, forty-one percent lower than its original price. The COVID-19 pandemic also forced the Park Hyatt hotel to close from March 21, 2020, to April 1, 2021. One unit sold in January 2021 for half its original listing price, and The Wall Street Journal reported the same June that some owners had seen "percentage losses in the double digits" during the past couple of years. Despite this, by early 2021, only five units remained unsold.

Notable residents 

When sales of One57 were launched, Barnett initially did not identify buyers. Nine billionaires including Lawrence Stroll and Silas Chou had purchased full-floor units at One57 by September 2012. The Prime Minister of Qatar, Sheikh Hamad bin Jassim bin Jaber Al Thani, had also agreed to purchase a penthouse unit for $100 million. Many buyers had moved to One57 from other luxury developments such as 15 Central Park West. By late 2013, One57 management characterized more than half the buyers as foreign buyers, with fifteen percent being from China. After One57 was completed, Robin Finn of The New York Times wrote so many headlines about high-profile sales in the tower that The Observer said, "It would be difficult for even the most creative writer to make sale after sale at the same new-construction building sound fresh." Barnett also occupied a one-bedroom unit at One57 so he could manage his work in New York City even as his family lived in Monsey, New York.

The building set the record for the city's second-most expensive residence in 2015, when hedge fund manager Bill Ackman bought a 75th floor duplex for $91.5 million. The building also had the city's most expensive residence at the time: the penthouse, which sold for $100.5 million in 2014. The buyer's identity was initially kept secret, but the media subsequently announced that the buyer had been Michael Dell, the CEO of Dell Technologies. Other notable buyers included apparel-firm billionaires Silas Chou and Lawrence Stroll, businessman Liu Yiqian, and businessman Robert Herjavec. The youngest buyer on record was a two-year-old Chinese girl, whose mother paid $6.5 million for a unit in 2013 so her daughter could use it when she attended college in fifteen years.  

Several prospective residents had their contracts canceled. Barnett refused to sell to British developer Nick Candy and another buyer after they both separately indicated their intentions to renovate their apartments. Candy had wanted to resell his apartment immediately after he had renovated it, while the anonymous buyer was unwilling to cooperate with Extell to minimize disruption for neighboring units. Entrepreneur Michael Hirtenstein's purchase was canceled after he hired a worker to film his unit, in spite of Barnett's request that buyers not see their units before purchase.

Critical reception
Many reviewers of One57 initially perceived the design negatively. One57 was named "Worst Building of the Year" in 2014 by Curbed, which said, "Pretty much everyone (or at least most archicritics) agrees that its wavy blue facade is ugly." According to New York magazine's architecture critic Justin Davidson, One57 was "so clumsily gaudy that a fellow architect surmised [that de Portzamparc] must be a socialist pranking the plutocrats". Davidson continued to regard One57 as "repulsive" in 2021, several years after its completion. Another architecture critic, James Russell, characterized the facade as "endless acres of cheap-looking frameless glass in cartoonish stripes and blotches of silver and pewter". Michael Kimmelman, in The New York Times, contrasted One57's "pox of tinted panes" against de Portzamparc's earlier, "jewel-like" LVMH Tower nearby. Robbie Whelan said that the design "tries to draw too much attention to itself", even on 57th Street, which had buildings of many architectural styles. By contrast, Carter Horsley wrote that the facade was not necessarily "random" but rather "impart an added sense of motion".

One57 was also criticized for its shape. Matthew Shaer wrote that the building resembled a "gleaming, tumescent phallus" that stood out from its surroundings, while the Times Kimmelman characterized the building's form as "cascade of clunky curves". Robin Finn of the Times wrote that the building was "a spike of bluish glass that does not scrape the Midtown sky as much as puncture it". Of One57's presence in general, Rick Hampson of USA Today wrote: "One57 exemplifies a new type of skyscraper—very tall, improbably slender, ostentatiously opulent—that is reshaping a famous skyline composed mostly of bulky office buildings." Ralph Gardner wrote for The Wall Street Journal that the 57th Street facade "shows some potential" and the north facade could help the building blend with the skyline, but the massing "appears an undisguised attempt to maximize air rights and monopolize park views for plutocrats".

Elizabeth Goldstein, the president of the Municipal Art Society, said the construction of One57 had precipitated the development of other supertall skyscrapers in New York City, many of which used zoning loopholes to rise higher than would normally be allowed. For this reason, Paul Goldberger called One57 "the first and the worst" of the city's supertall skyscrapers, but he said it was not possible to "freeze the city" in terms of development. According to Ralph Gardner, One57's construction had "obliterated" the views of the "claustrophobic thicket of towers in the Carnegie Hall vicinity", including Metropolitan Tower, Carnegie Hall Tower, and CitySpire.

In 2014, PBS described One57 in a fifty-five-minute clip entitled "The Billionaire Building", the second part of a four-part documentary entitled Super Skyscrapers. The tower became less popular several years after its opening, being overtaken by other supertall towers on Billionaires' Row. The 2017 book Life at the Top: New York’s Most Exceptional Apartment Buildings, published three years after One57's completion, did not mention the building even as it mentioned 432 Park Avenue.

See also
 List of tallest buildings in New York City
 List of tallest buildings in the United States
 List of tallest residential buildings

References

Notes

Citations

External links

 
 One57 listing on skyscrapercenter.com

2014 establishments in New York City
Hotel buildings completed in 2014
Midtown Manhattan
Pencil towers in New York City
Residential buildings completed in 2014
Residential condominiums in New York City
Residential skyscrapers in Manhattan
Skyscraper hotels in Manhattan
Skyscrapers on  57th Street (Manhattan)
2010s in Manhattan